Gorgisheli is a Ukrainian rock band. The band's songs are sung in the Ukrainian and Georgian languages. Their music combines elements of art rock, Georgian and Ukrainian folk music with a modern sound.

The project was known from 1997 to year as Black September (Chornyy Veresen'). A new sound emerged when the well-known bass player John (Project "Is" in 1995 and 2002, Tea Fan Club, Oh, Dead Rooster) joined the group.

The group has participated in many festivals, including Melody, Black Sea Games, Red Rue (Chervona Ruta), Pearls of the Season, Pok-existence, Europe Center, Taras Bulba, the festival of Ukrainian culture in Sopot, Poland. The members of the band participated in the TV show Fresh Blood (Svizha Krov) on M1 channel, where they scored the largest number of points of all participants. Gorgisheli's performance during the Orange Revolution issue hit Euronews.

In summer 2006, the band signed a long-term contract with Comp Music/EMI, in cooperation with which their debut album entitled Amore was released on November 20 of that year.

Band members 
 Tamara Gorgisheli - main vocals, acoustic guitar
 Eteri Gorgisheli -  back vocals, bass guitar
 Oleg Sook - keyboard
 Oleksiy Slobodian - drums
 Marian Kozovyy - electric guitar

Discography

Albums 

2006 — Аморе (Amore)
2009 — Live (Live)
2010 — Ромбамбар (Rombambar/Rhubarb)

References

External links

Musical groups established in 1997
Ukrainian rock music groups